Eduard Fernández Serrano (born 25 August 1964) is a Spanish screen and stage actor. He is the recipient of numerous accolades, including three Goya Awards and four Gaudí Awards.

Biography 
Eduard Fernández was born in Barcelona on 25 August 1964. He trained as a mime artist at the Barcelona's Institut del Teatre, and did street performances as such. He had a 25-year relationship with writer , with whom he had one daughter, Greta, who is also an actress.

Following a theatre (he was a member of ) and television career, he made his feature film debut at age 30, in 1994 film Souvenir. His breakthrough film role in 1999 thriller Washington Wolves earned him a nomination to the Goya Award for Best New Actor.

Partial filmography

Accolades

References

External links
 

1964 births
Living people
Spanish male film actors
Spanish male stage actors
Spanish male television actors
20th-century Spanish male actors
21st-century Spanish male actors
Male actors from Barcelona
Best Actor Goya Award winners
Best Supporting Actor Goya Award winners